The 2019 Mid-Eastern Athletic Conference baseball tournament began on May 15 and ended on May 18 at Jackie Robinson Ballpark on the campus of Bethune-Cookman University in Daytona Beach, FL.  It was a six-team double elimination tournament.  The winner, Florida A&M, claimed the Mid-Eastern Athletic Conference's automatic bid to the 2019 NCAA Division I baseball tournament.  Bethune-Cookman had claimed sixteen of the prior twenty tournament championships, with North Carolina A&T earning the 2005 and 2018 titles, Florida A&M winning in 2015, and Savannah State in 2013.

Format and seeding
The top three teams in the North and South Division were seeded one through three based on regular season records, with first round matchups of the second seed from the North and the third seed from the South, and the second seed from the South and the third seed from the North. The winners advanced in the winners' bracket, while first round losers played elimination games. The top seed from each division earned a first round bye.

Bracket

Game summaries

Conference championship

References

Tournament
Mid-Eastern Athletic Conference Baseball Tournament
MEAC baseball tournament
Mid-Eastern Athletic Conference Baseball
Baseball competitions in Florida
College sports tournaments in Florida